Indio may refer to:

Places
 Indio, Bovey Tracey, an historic estate in Devon, England
 Indio, California, a city in Riverside County, California, United States

People with the name
 Indio (musician), Canadian musician Gordon Peterson
 Índio, Brazilian football players: 
 Índio (footballer, born 1931), or Aluísio Francisco da Luz
 Índio (footballer, born 1972), or Francisco Anibio da Silva Costa, indoor footballer, see 2004 FIFA Futsal World Championship
 Índio (footballer, born 1975), or Marcos Antônio de Lima
 Índio (footballer, born 1979), or José Sátiro do Nascimento
 Índio (footballer, born 1981), or Antônio Rogério Silva Oliveira
 Índio (footballer, born 1996), or Matheus da Cunha Gomes

Ethnicities
 Indio, a term referring to the indigenous peoples of the Americas
 Indio, or Indios Chinos, the Spanish Colonial racial term for the native Austronesian peoples of the East Indies and majority of the Philippines. 
 Indio, the Spanish term for Indian people, and/or people from India

Arts, entertainment, and media

Films and television
 Indio (1981 film), Filipino film by Carlo J. Caparas
 Indio (1989 film), Italian film by Anthony M. Dawson
 Indio (TV series) (2013), a fictional epic set upon the start of the Spanish colonization of the Philippines

Music
 Indio (album) by Australian rock-pop band, Indecent Obsession (1992)
 "Indio" (song) by Indecent Obsession taken from the album of the same name (1992)
 ""Índios"", song by Legião Urbana taken from the album Dois (1986)

Other uses
 Indio (beer), a Mexican beer brand
 Indio (coin), a Portuguese coin minted from 1499 to 1504
 Indios de Ciudad Juárez, a football team

See also 
 El Indio (disambiguation)
 India